Fritz Ewert (9 February 1937 in Düsseldorf – 16 March 1990 in Heimerzheim) was a German football player. He spent three seasons in the Bundesliga with 1. FC Köln. He represented Germany in four friendlies.

Honours
 Bundesliga champion: 1963–64
 Bundesliga runner-up: 1964–65

References

External links
 

1937 births
1990 deaths
German footballers
Germany international footballers
1. FC Köln players
AZ Alkmaar players
Bundesliga players
TuRU Düsseldorf players
Association football goalkeepers
Footballers from Düsseldorf